The Academia Panameña de la Lengua (Spanish for Panamanian Academy of Language) is an association of academics and experts on the use of the Spanish language in Panama.
It was founded in Panama City on August 9, 1926. 
Both former presidents Ricardo Joaquín Alfaro Jované and Ernesto de la Guardia were members of the academy.
It is a member of the Association of Spanish Language Academies.

Spanish language academies
Panamanian culture
Organizations established in 1926
1926 establishments in North America